The đàn tính, or tính tẩu (gourd lute), is a stringed musical instrument from tianqin ( of Zhuang people in China, imported to Vietnam by the Tay people of Lạng Sơn Province in Vietnam. Although "tinh tau" originated as a Tay word, both names are used in Vietnamese. The instrument has two strings in two courses. The strings are made of silk, nylon or fishing wire. It is used by shamans in séances in the hope that it will be animated by spirits.

In 2007, Vietnam's Ministry of Culture, Sports and Tourism submitted a plan to promote the instrument, as well as the "Then" style of singing that it often accompanies. A seminar recommended that traditional songs be transcribed and recordings made, and that local art schools provide instruction in this type of music.

See also
Traditional Vietnamese musical instruments

References

External links
 The Stringed Instrument Database
 ATLAS of Plucked Instruments

String instruments
Vietnamese musical instruments